Uglješa Radinović (born 25 August 1993) is a Serbian professional footballer who plays as a midfielder.

References

External links

Uglješa Radinović stats at utakmica.rs 

1993 births
Living people
Footballers from Novi Sad
Serbian footballers
FK Bežanija players
FK Rad players
FK Rudar Prijedor players
FK Borac Banja Luka players
FC Zbrojovka Brno players
FK Željezničar Sarajevo players
OFK Bačka players
FK Proleter Novi Sad players
Serbian SuperLiga players
Serbian First League players
Premier League of Bosnia and Herzegovina players
Czech National Football League players
Serbian expatriate footballers
Expatriate footballers in the Czech Republic
Serbian expatriate sportspeople in the Czech Republic
Expatriate footballers in Bosnia and Herzegovina
Serbian expatriate sportspeople in Bosnia and Herzegovina
Association football midfielders